The discography of Cursive, an American indie rock band, consists of seven studio albums, one compilation album, six EPs, eight singles, and eleven music videos.

Studio albums

Compilation albums

EPs

Singles

Music videos

Other appearances
The following Cursive songs were released on compilation and tribute albums. This is not an exhaustive list; songs that were first released on the band's albums, EPs, or singles are not included.

Notes

References

Rock music group discographies
Discographies of American artists